Quarry is a town in Monroe County, Ohio, United States that no longer exists. If Quarry still existed today, it would be located in today's Wayne National Forest.

Coordinates for Quarry are  +39.59202, -81.22067.

Nearby communities include Devola, Marietta, and Parkersburg, West Virginia.

References

Ghost towns in Ohio
Populated places in Monroe County, Ohio